Rhodesia competed at the 1972 Summer Paralympics in Heidelberg, West Germany. It was the last time the nation competed at the Paralympic Games before returning as Zimbabwe at the 1980 Summer Paralympics. The delegation consisted of 13 competitors in the sports of track and field athletics and swimming. Three athletes (Avril Davis, Sandra James, and Leslie Manson-Bishop) competed in both sports.

Rhodesia had also been invited to take part in the 1972 Summer Olympics, but the invitation was withdrawn by the International Olympic Committee four days before the opening ceremony, in response to African countries' protests against the Rhodesian regime. As the Paralympics that year were held before the Olympics, Rhodesia was able to take part in the Paralympic Games.

Medalists

Athletics

Swimming

Men

Women

References

Nations at the 1972 Summer Paralympics
1972
Paralympics
1972